Carmelo Psaila, better known as Dun Karm (Żebbuġ, 18 October 1871 – 13 October 1961) was a Maltese priest, writer and poet, sometimes called 'the bard of Malta'. He is widely recognised as the Maltese national poet.

Life 
He was educated at the seminary between the years 1885 and 1894 and then proceeded to study philosophy in 1888 and theology in 1890 the University of Malta. He was ordained priest in 1894. From 1895 to 1921 he taught various subjects at the seminary: Italian, Latin, English, arithmetic, geography, cosmography, ecclesiastical history and Christian archaeology. In 1921 he was appointed assistant librarian at the National Library of Malta and in 1923 director of circulating libraries, a post he held till his retirement in 1936.

Dun Karm was one of the founding members of the Għaqda tal-Kittieba tal-Malti (founded in 1921) and on the death of Ġużè Muscat Azzopardi in 1927, he was elected president of the Għaqda and later editor of the official organ, Il-Malti. He carried out these functions till 1942 when he was nominated honorary president of the Għaqda for life. In recognition of his contribution to Maltese literature, he was granted a D. Litt (honoris causa) by the Royal University of Malta in 1945 - the first time the University granted such an honour. A year later he was awarded the Ġużè Muscat Azzopardi gold medal. Queen Elizabeth II decorated him with the Commander of the Order of the British Empire in 1956. In 1957 the Maltese government issued him an ex-gratia pension in recognition of his services to Maltese literature.

Works 
Dun Karm is best known as the author the verses of a good number of popular religious hymns in Maltese, including the Maltese national anthem. In 1921, Albert Laferla, the director of education, asked Dun Karm to compose some verses to a music score by Robert Samut. The Innu Malti was sung for the first time in 1923. In 1941 it was officially designated the national anthem, a status confirmed by the Constitution at independence in 1964. Yet, Dun Karm is not deemed the Maltese "national poet" merely because he wrote the text of the national anthem but rather for having written prolifically in Maltese, and producing works conscious of a "Maltese identity. Dun Karm was conscious that his identity, that that of most people who inhabited the Maltese islands, could not be too easily collapsed into an extended form of the "Britishness", "Italianità del Risorgimento" or "Italianità cattolica", which were the subject of endless political debates among the intellectuals of the time. Yet, Dun Karm is rarely labelled a "nationalist" or a "patriot" in the way such terms are usually used in the English language: he sought to put his finger on the identity of the common people of the islands, while not trying to mimic the national identities of the major European polities by Romantic movements as a reaction to the cosmopolitanism of the French Revolution and the Napolenonic Wars.

His first works in Italian reveal an early life of peace and calm; after the death of his mother, solitude became his companion. Such solitude is present throughout his works, eventually accompanied by a high degree of spiritual balance. Some of his poems illustrate an inner journey of sentimental and moral experience. Nonetheless, besides expressing such subjectivity, Dun Karm's works also give voice to his country's collective aspirations. His poetry reflects a background of village life with an atmosphere of family feelings and it also portrays the Maltese countryside with a perspective imagination. It synthesises the popular culture of the Maltese people, which is evident from the rural characteristics that furnish its local identity with the literary culture based largely on Italian romanticism. When he decided to make Maltese the medium of his creativity, Dun Karm poetically explored the history of Malta to confirm its cultural and national identity. Both the personal and the national sentiments are treated from a deeply religious viewpoint that discusses existentialism. The spiritual crisis in Il-Jien u lil hinn Minnu is analysed in universal human terms that illuminate human existence and insist on the ineffable relation that exists between God and the human person, while pointing to the need of the latter's absolute acceptance of the former's hidden power.

Before 1912 Dun Karm wrote only in Italian. His first known published poem is La Dignità Episcopale (1889) after which he published Foglie d'Alloro (1896) and Versi (1903) another collection of Italian poems. Dun Karm wrote Quddiem Xbieha tal-Madonna, his first poem in Maltese, which appeared in the first issue of the Maltese periodical Il-Ħabib, published by Pawl Galea and Ġużè Muscat Azzopardi. His best-known poems include Il-Musbieħ tal-Mużew (1920).

A.J. Arberry translated about 37 of Dun Karm's poems into English, Ġużè Delia translated Il-Vjatku into Spanish and Laurent Ropa translated Il-Jien u lil hinn Minnu into French. Carmel Mallia translated the latter into Esperanto. Yevgeniy Vitkovskiy  translated Ħerba, Kewkbet is-Safar, and Wied Qirda into Russian.

Dun Karm's writings include Żewġ Anġli: Inez u Emilia (translated in 1934 from an Italian novel by D Caprile) Besides these he wrote a few critical works. He also compiled a dictionary between 1947 and 1955 in three volumes, Dizzjunarju Ingliż u Malti.

See also 
 Hymns by Dun Karm Psaila
 L-Innu Malti

References 

1871 births
1961 deaths
National anthem writers
19th-century Maltese Roman Catholic priests
People from Żebbuġ
Catholic poets
Maltese male poets
20th-century Maltese poets
19th-century Maltese poets
20th-century Maltese Roman Catholic priests
19th-century male writers
20th-century male writers
Italian-language writers from Malta